Muehlenbeckia hastulata is a species of plant in the family Polygonaceae. It is a rapidly growing climbing plant and is common in Chile.

References

hastulata